Herpetacanthus is a genus of flowering plants belonging to the family Acanthaceae.

Its native range is Central and Southern Tropical America.

Species:

Herpetacanthus acaulis 
Herpetacanthus acuminatus 
Herpetacanthus angustatus 
Herpetacanthus chalarostachyus 
Herpetacanthus delicatus 
Herpetacanthus longiflorus 
Herpetacanthus longipetiolatus 
Herpetacanthus macahensis 
Herpetacanthus macrophyllus 
Herpetacanthus magnobracteolatus 
Herpetacanthus melancholicus 
Herpetacanthus napoensis 
Herpetacanthus neesianus 
Herpetacanthus panamensis 
Herpetacanthus parvispica 
Herpetacanthus pauciflorus 
Herpetacanthus rotundatus 
Herpetacanthus rubiginosus 
Herpetacanthus stenophyllus 
Herpetacanthus strongyloides 
Herpetacanthus tetrandrus

References

Acanthaceae
Acanthaceae genera